This page details Northampton Town Football Club records.

Honours

League
English 2nd Tier
 Runners-up: 1964–65
English 3rd Tier
 Champions: 1962–63
 Runners-up: 1927–28, 1949–50
English 4th Tier
 Champions: 1986–87, 2015–16
 Runners-up: 1975–76, 2005–06
 Promoted: 1960–61, 1999–2000
 Promoted as Play-off Winners: 1996–97, 2019–20
Southern Football League
 Champions: 1908–09
 Runners-up: 1910–11

Cups
Charity Shield
 Runners-up: 1909
FA Cup:
 Best: Round 5 1969–70
Football League Cup:
 Best: Quarter-final 1964–65, 1966–67
Football League Trophy:
 Best: Area Semi-final 1996–97, 2003–04

Team records
Record win:
11-1 v Southend United (H), Southern League 1909/10

Record defeat:
0-11 v Southampton (A), Southern League, 1901/02

Most points gained in a season:
99 (1986/87, Football League Fourth Division), (2015/16, Football League Two)

Fewest points gained in a season:
19 (1906/07, Southern League)

Most goals scored in a season:
109: 1952-53 (Football League Third Division South) and 1962-63 (Football League Third Division)

Appearances

Most appearances
All-time most appearances  (Does not include wartime appearances)

Current players in bold.

Most appearances – 552 by Tommy Fowler (1946–1961)
Most league appearances – 521 by Tommy Fowler (1946–1961)
Most appearances in the first tier (Premier League and predecessors) – 42 by Joe Kiernan
Most appearances in the second tier (Championship and predecessors) – 111 by Terry Branston
Most appearances in the third tier (League One and predecessors) – 138 by Peter Gleasure
Most appearances in the fourth tier (League Two and predecessors) – 521 by Tommy Fowler
Most FA Cup appearances – 34 by Tommy Wells (26 November 1927 – 12 January 1934)
Most League Cup appearances – 25 by Joe Kiernan (4 November 1963 – 18 August 1972) and Peter Gleasure (29 August 1983 – 10 October 1990)
Most appearances in a single season – 58 by John Frain (45 in FL, 3 PO, 5 FAC, 2 FLC, 3 AWS – 1997–98)

Youngest and oldest appearances
Longest Spell at club – 15 years by Tommy Fowler (1946–1961))
Youngest first-team player – 15 years 336 days by Josh Tomlinson (v Brighton & Hove Albion U23's, 3 November 2021)
Oldest first-team player – 43 years 42 days by Lloyd Davies (v Exeter City, 3 April 1920)

Goalscorers

Top goalscorers
Top 20 all-time top goalscorers (Does not include wartime appearances.)

Current players in bold.

Most goals – 143 by Jack English
Most league goals – 135 by Jack English
Most goals in the first tier (Premier League and predecessors) – 9 by Bobby Brown
Most goals in the second tier (Championship and predecessors) – 33 by Don Martin
Most goals in the third tier (League One and predecessors) – 50 by Cliff Holton
Most goals in the fourth tier (League Two and predecessors) – 135 by Jack English
Most FA Cup goals – 20 by Tommy Wells
Most League Cup goals – 11 by Don Martin

Top goalscorers in individual matches and seasons
Most goals scored in a single season – 39 by Cliff Holton (1961–62)
Most goals scored in a season in the first tier (Premier League and predecessors) – 9 by Bobby Brown (1965–66
Most goals scored in a season in the second tier (Championship and predecessors) – 
Most goals scored in a season in the third tier (League One and predecessors) – 36 by Cliff Holton (1961–62)
Most goals scored in a season in the fourth tier (League Two and predecessors) – 32 by Alan Woan (1958–59)
Most goals scored in one game – 5 by Ralph Hoten (v Crystal Palace, 27 October 1928) and Albert Dawes (v Lloyds Bank, 26 November 1932)
Most goals scored on debut – 3 by Billy Clarke (v Crewe Alexandra, 24 January 2009)

Other goalscoring records
Most consecutive games scored in – 
Most consecutive league games scored in –  by (–)
Most hat-tricks (or better) – 7 by Albert Dawes and Albert Lewis
Most penalties scored –  by 
Youngest goalscorer – 16 years 321 days by Josh Tomlinson (v Arsenal U21s, 18 October 2022)
Oldest goalscorer – 39 years 195 days by Tommy Crilly (v Reading, 30 January 1935)
Youngest to score hat-trick – 19 Years 3 days by Paul Stratford (v Workington, 1 October 1974)
Oldest to score hat-trick – 34 Years 347 days by Tommy Fowler (v Gillingham, 27 December 1958)
Quickest goal – 
Quickest hat-trick – 4 minutes by Neil Grayson (v Hartlepool United, 25 January 1997)

Player records

Most Clean Sheets in a season:
Lee Harper and Mark Bunn, 25 (23 in league), 2005–06

Most Capped Player:
Lloyd Davies - 12 caps for Wales

Home Attendances
Only competitive first-team matches are considered.
Highest attendance at the County Ground:24,523 v Fulham, First Division, 23 April 1966
Highest attendance at Sixfields Stadium:7,798 v Manchester United, EFL Cup, 21 September 20167,798 v Derby County, FA Cup, 24 January 2020

Transfers
Transfer Fee Paid: 
£165,000 to Oldham Athletic for Josh Low on 30 July 2003
Transfer Fee Received: 
£1,000,000 (+ add ons) from Brentford for Charlie Goode on 19 August 2020

References

Northampton
Records